Okutanius is a genus of sea snails, marine gastropod mollusks in the subfamily Fusininae of the family Fasciolariidae, the spindle snails, the tulip snails and their allies.

Species
According to the World Register of Marine Species (WoRMS) the following species with accepted names are included within the genus Okutanius 
 Okutanius aikeni (Lussi, 2014)
 Okutanius ellenae Kantor, Fedosov, Snyder & Bouchet, 2018
 Okutanius kuroseanus (Okutani, 1975)

References

External links
 Kantor Y.I., Fedosov A.E., Snyder M.A. & Bouchet P. (2018). Pseudolatirus Bellardi, 1884 revisited, with the description of two new genera and five new species (Neogastropoda: Fasciolariidae). European Journal of Taxonomy. 433: 1-57